is a Japanese kickboxer, currently comepting in the super bantamweight division of RISE

As of September 2022 he was the #10 ranked Strawweight kickboxer in the world by Combat Press.

Kickboxing career
Omori made his professional debut against Takaya Nanami at RISE 136 on January 13, 2020. He won the fight by a third-round knockout.
Omori faced Keito Asahi at RISE DEAD OR ALIVE 2020 OSAKA on November 1, 2020, in his second appearance with RISE. He won the fight by a first-round knockout.

Omori faced Rikiya at RISE Eldorado 2021 on February 28, 2021. He won the fight by technical knockout, after dropping Rikiya three times by the 2:32 minute mark of the second round. Omori next faced Yosuke at the May 16, 2021, RISE on Abema event. He won the fight by unanimous decision, the first decision victory of his professional career. Two judges scored the bout 30–28 for him, while the third judge scored it 30–29 for him.

Omori participated in the 2021 Cage Kick Championship tournament, held at Shooto 2021 Vol.4 on July 4, 2021. His four-fight winning streak was snapped, as he was defeated in the quarter finals by unanimous decision by Shoa Arii.

After suffering the first loss of his professional career, Omori was booked to face Kanta Tabuchi at Rise World Series Osaka 2 on November 14, 2021. He won the fight by majority decision. Two of the judges scored the bout 30–29 in his favor, while the third judge scored it as an even 29–29 draw.

Omoiri faced Rasta at RISE 157 on April 24, 2022. He won the fight by knockout in the second round.

Omori faced the sixth-ranked RISE super bantamweight contender Yuki Kyotani at RISE World Series Osaka 2022 on August 21, 2022. He won the fight by a second-round knockout, flooring his opponent with a well placed knee to the body.

Omori faced Yugo Kato at RISE 163 on December 10, 2022. He lost the fight by majority decision, with scores of 30–29, 29–28 and 29–29.

Titles and accomplishments

Amateur
 2019 Japan Cup Selection Tournament -60 kg Winner
 2019 Dageki Kakutougi Japan Cup -60 kg Champion

Fight record

|-  style="background:#fbb;"
| 2022-12-10|| Loss ||align=left| Yugo Kato || RISE 163 || Tokyo, Japan || Decision (Majority)|| 3 ||3:00 

|-  style="background:#cfc;"
| 2022-08-21 || Win ||align=left| Yuki Kyotani ||  RISE WORLD SERIES OSAKA 2022 || Osaka, Japan ||KO (Knee to the body) || 2 || 1:39

|-  style="background:#cfc;"
| 2022-04-24 ||Win||align=left| Rasta|| RISE 157 || Tokyo, Japan||KO (Punches)|| 2 || 2:38 

|-  style="background:#cfc"
| 2021-11-14 || Win ||align=left| Kanta Tabuchi|| Rise World Series Osaka 2 || Osaka, Japan || Decision (Majority) || 3 || 3:00

|-  style="text-align:center; background:#fbb;"
| 2021-07-04|| Loss ||align=left| Shoa Arii || Shooto Cage Kick Championship, Quarter Final  || Osaka, Japan ||  Decision (Unanimous) ||3  ||3:00 

|-  style="text-align:center; background:#cfc;"
| 2021-05-16 || Win||align=left| Yosuke || RISE on ABEMA  || Tokyo, Japan|| Decision (Unanimous) ||3  ||3:00 

|-  style="text-align:center; background:#cfc;"
| 2021-02-28 || Win || align=left| Rikiya || RISE Eldorado 2021 || Yokohama, Japan || TKO (Three knockdowns) || 2 || 2:32

|-  style="text-align:center; background:#cfc;"
| 2020-11-01|| Win || align=left| Keito Asahi || RISE DEAD OR ALIVE 2020 OSAKA || Osaka, Japan || KO (Spinning back kick to the body) || 1|| 2:34

|-  style="text-align:center; background:#cfc;"
| 2020-01-13|| Win || align=left| Takaya Nanami|| RISE 136 || Tokyo, Japan || KO (Right straight) || 3||1:17
|-
| colspan=9 | Legend:    

|-  style="text-align:center; background:#cfc;"
| 2019-10-27|| Win || align=left| Reo Yoshida || Amateur Dageki Kakutougi Japan Cup 2019, Final || Tokyo, Japan || Decision || 2 || 2:00 
|-
! style=background:white colspan=9 |

|-  style="text-align:center; background:#cfc;"
| 2019-10-27|| Win || align=left| Ryuki Yamamoto || Amateur Dageki Kakutougi Japan Cup 2019, Semi Final || Tokyo, Japan || ||  || 

|-  style="text-align:center; background:#CCFFCC;"
| 2019-08-04|| Win || align=left| Reo Yoshida || KAMINARIMON, Japan Cup Selection Tournament -60kg Final|| Tokyo, Japan || Decision (Majority) ||1 ||2:00
|-
! style=background:white colspan=9 |

|-  style="text-align:center; background:#CCFFCC;"
| 2019-08-04|| Win || align=left| Towa Yamaguchi || KAMINARIMON, Japan Cup Selection Tournament -60kg Semi Final|| Tokyo, Japan || Decision (Unanimous) ||1 ||2:00

|-  style="text-align:center; background:#CCFFCC;"
| 2019-08-04|| Win || align=left| Kosuke Yano || KAMINARIMON, Japan Cup Selection Tournament -60kg Quarter Final|| Tokyo, Japan || Decision (Unanimous) ||1 ||2:00

|-  style="text-align:center; background:#CCFFCC;"
| 2019-01-20|| Win || align=left| Ryoga Matsumoto|| NEXT☆LEVEL Kansai 53|| Sakai, Japan || Decision (Unanimous) ||2 ||2:00

|-  style="text-align:center; background:#CCFFCC;"
| 2018-12-02|| Win || align=left| Takuma Sudo || KAMINARIMON || Tokyo, Japan || Decision (Unanimous) ||2 ||2:00

|-  style="text-align:center; background:#CCFFCC;"
| 2018-12-02|| Win || align=left| Sho Ota|| KAMINARIMON || Tokyo, Japan || Decision (Unanimous) ||2 ||2:00

|-
| colspan=9 | Legend:

See also
 List of male kickboxers

References

Living people
1999 births
Japanese male kickboxers
Sportspeople from Osaka
21st-century Japanese people